Aïn El Kebira (in Arabic: عين الكبيرة, formerly Périgotville) is a city located 27 km north far from Sétif. As Ancient Satafis it was a bishopric, which remains a Catholic titular see.
 
Ain El Kebira is a daïra (district, part of a vilayet (province), comprising several municipalities) in the Algerian regional classification.

History 
The Romans of Djémila used it for entering their dead. Ancient city Satafis was important enough under Roman rule to become a suffragan bishopric in the Roman province of Mauretania Sitifensis.

Inscriptions testify to Christian community cristiana since the early 4th century, including the tomb of local priest Securus.

Four historically documented bishops are attributed to this see :
 An inscription in 324 names Avianus Crescens
 Catholic Adeodatus and his Donatist heretical counterpart Urbanus attended the Council of Carthage held in 411 on that very schism.
 Festus intervened at the synod called in the same Carthage by king Huneric of the Vandal Kingdom in 484, after which he was exiled, like most Catholic bishops.

It faded like most in Roman Africa, presumably at the 7th century advent of Islam.

The modern city was created in the French colonial time under the name of Périgotville.

Its present name "Ain El Kebira" means "the big fountain" in Arabic.

Titular see 
The diocese was nominally restored in 1933 as titular bishopric of Satafis (Latin and Curiate Italian) / Satafen(sis) in Mauretania Sitifensi (Latin adjective).

It has had the following incumbents, so far of the fitting Episcopal (lowest) rank :
 Antonio Teutonico (1966.03.31 – death 1978.05.31) on emeritate as former Bishop of Aversa (Italy) (1936.07.28 – retired 1966.03.31)
 Franjo Komarica (1985.10.28 – 1989.05.15) as Auxiliary Bishop of Banja Luka (Bosnia and Herzegovina) (1985.10.28 – 1989.05.15); succeeded as Bishop of Banja Luka (Bosnia and Herzegovina) (1989.05.15 – ...), also President of Episcopal Conference of Bosnia and Herzegovina (2002 – 2005 and 2010.04 – 2015.03.20)
 Norberto Eugenio Conrado Martina, Friars Minor (O.F.M.) (1990.11.08 – resigned 1998.03.07) as Military Ordinary of Argentina (Argentina) (1990.11.08 – death 2001.08.28)
 Sergio Alfredo Fenoy (1999.04.03 – 2006.12.05) as Auxiliary Bishop of Rosario (Argentina) (1999.04.03 – 2006.12.05); later Bishop of San Miguel (Argentina) (2006.12.05 – ...)
 Peter Anthony Libasci (2007.04.03 – 2011.09.19) as Auxiliary Bishop of Rockville Centre (USA) (2007.04.03 – 2011.09.19); later Bishop of Manchester (USA) (2011.09.19 – ...)
 Rutilo Felipe Pozos Lorenzini (2013.12.06 – ...) as Auxiliary Bishop of Puebla de los Ángeles (Mexico) (2013.12.06 – ...).

See also 

 List of Catholic dioceses in Algeria
 nearby Sitifis, modern Sétif and also a Catholic titular see

References

Sources and external links 
 AinElKebira.com
 Setif.com
 GCatholic - (titular) bishopric
 Bibliography - ecclesiastical history
 Pius Bonifacius Gams, Series episcoporum Ecclesiae Catholicae, Leipzig 1931, p. 468
 Stefano Antonio Morcelli, Africa christiana, Volume I, Brescia 1816, pp. 270–271
 J. Mesnage, L'Afrique chrétienne, Paris 1912, p. 350

Populated places in Sétif Province
Coloniae (Roman)